Victor Doney (25 December 1881 – 12 October 1961) was an Australian politician who was a Country Party member of the Legislative Assembly of Western Australia from 1928 to 1956. He served as a minister in the government of Sir Ross McLarty.

Doney was born in Lerryn, Cornwall, England, to Rebecca (née Yeo) and Frank Doney. He came to Western Australia in 1912, and settled on a farm at Mullewa. Doney was elected to the Mullewa Road Board in 1914, and served as chairman for a period, but the following year enlisted in the Australian Imperial Force. He served in France with the 28th Battalion, and in July 1916 was wounded in action. Doney returned to Australia after being discharged in June 1919, and worked as a property inspector for the Agricultural Bank of Western Australia in Mullewa and Narrogin. He entered parliament at a by-election in November 1928, winning the seat of Williams-Narrogin unopposed after the resignation of Bertie Johnston.

After the 1947 state election, where a Liberal–Country coalition government, Doney was made Minister for Works and Minister for Water Supply in the new ministry formed by Ross McLarty. His seat was abolished at the 1950 election, and he transferred to the new seat of Narrogin. After that election, a ministerial reshuffle occurred, with Doney becoming Chief Secretary, Minister for Local Government, and Minister for Native Affairs. He remained in the ministry until the government's defeat at the 1953 election, and left parliament at the 1956 election. Doney died in Perth in October 1961, aged 79. He had married Dorothy Mary Beech in 1920, with whom he had three children.

References

1881 births
1961 deaths
Australian Army soldiers
Australian military personnel of World War I
Australian people of Cornish descent
British emigrants to Australia
Mayors of places in Western Australia
Members of the Western Australian Legislative Assembly
National Party of Australia members of the Parliament of Western Australia
20th-century Australian politicians
Western Australian local councillors